Víctor Manuel Fernández (born 18 July 1962) is an Argentine prelate of the Catholic Church and a theologian. He served as rector of the Pontifical Catholic University of Argentina from December 2009 to April 2018. He was named Archbishop of La Plata on 2 June 2018.

He is addressed familiarly as "Tucho".

Life

Education and early career
He was born on 18 July 1962 in Alcira Gigena, in Córdoba Province. He father Emilio was a shopkeeper who supported Raúl Alfonsín, the radical political leader. Fernández entered the seminary in 1988, studying philosophy and theology at the major seminary of Córdoba. He was ordained a Roman Catholic deacon on 21 December 1985 and a priest on 15 August 1986 at Río Cuarto, where he spent most of his ecclesiastical career. In 1988 he obtained a degree in Theology with a biblical specialization at the Pontifical Gregorian University in Rome, and he obtained a doctorate in Theology at the Theology Faculty of the Pontifical Catholic University of Argentina in 1990, with a thesis about the relationship between knowledge and life in Saint Bonaventure. In Río Cuarto, he was director of catechesis and advisor of lay movements from 1989 to 1997, founder and rector of the Faculty of Sacred Sciences and Philosophy «Jesús Buen Pastor» and of the Diocesan Institute of Lay Formation from 1990 to 1993. He was priest of the parish of Santa Teresita from 1993 to 2000. He served as a trainer and study director of the Rio Cuarto seminary from 1988 to 1993 and from 2000 to 2007, and he was a delegate of ecumenism from 2003 to 2005.

Theologian and educator
In the late 1990s, he followed the recommendation of the Archbishop of Buenos Aires Jorge Bergoglio and declined an invitation to head a theological institute in Bogotá.

He was an expert of the Faith and Culture Commission and the Secretariat for the Permanent Formation of the Argentine Episcopal Conference, reader of the Commission of Catechesis of the Argentine Episcopate, member of the reflection team that advised the Argentine episcopate for the updating of the Pastoral Lines (NMA), and collaborator in CELAM in the field of pastoral theological reflection and also as a guest and expert in the Editorial Committee of the V General Assemply of the Episcopal Conference of Latin America in Aparecida in 2007.

He was professor of numerous subjects in several institutions. He taught at the Faculty of Theology of the PCUA, and also at the Franciscan Theological Institute of Saint Anthony of Padua.

He was co-director of several books published by the Faculty of Theology of the UCA and director of Theology Magazine from 2003 to 2008. He also presided over the Argentine Society of Theology from September 2007 to December 2009.

He headed the Faculty of Theology at the Pontifical Catholic University of Argentina (CUA) when Cardinal Bergoglio nominated him to serve as its rector on 15 December 2009. He took his oath of office on 20 May 2011, when his designation received confirmation from the Congregation for Catholic Education, which had withheld its assent while Fernandez responded to objections to his appointment from the Congregation for the Doctrine of the Faith (CDF). Bergoglio resented this questioning of his judgment and Fernández found the process itself disrespectful when he traveled to Rome only to have the CDF cancel a meeting at the last minute. 

When Cardinal Bergoglio became Pope Francis, he named Fernández titular archbishop of Tiburnia on 13 May 2013, and he received his episcopal consecration on 15 June 2013 in the Metropolitan Cathedral of Buenos Aires from the Archbishop of Buenos Aires, Mario Poli, with the Archbishop of Santa Fe José María Arancedo, the bishop of Río Cuarto, Eduardo Martín, the bishop of Quilmes, Carlos Tissera, and the Archbishop of Corrientes, Andrés Stanovnik, as consecrators. Fernández wore a pectoral cross Francis   sent him from Rome. He was the first rector of the University to be made an archbishop. As Francis' first Argentine episcopal appointment, it was seen as a rebuke to the Roman Curia with which Francis as Archbishop of Buenos Aires had an occasionally antagonistic relationship, especially with the attempt of some in Rome to block Fernández appointment as rector of UCA in 2011.

Pope Francis named him to the commission that drafted the concluding message (relatio) of the Extraordinary Synod of Bishops on the Family, held in October 2014.

Francis named him a member of the Fourteenth Ordinary General Assembly of the Synod of Bishops in October 2015 and appointed him to the drafting committee for the final report to be submitted to the synod participants for their votes.

On 17 December 2016, he was named a consultor to the Congregation for Catholic Education.

He ended his tenure as rector of the CUA on 25 April 2018, after completing the maximum two terms in that post.

Archbishop of La Plata
Following the election of Pope Francis, Fernandez was often mentioned as a candidate for an important post in the Roman Curia, such as head of the Congregation for Catholic Education or, more distantly, prefect of the Congregation for the Doctrine of the Faith. Pope Francis named him Archbishop of La Plata on 2 June 2018 to succeed Héctor Rubén Aguer, who had been in poor health for several years, had submitted his resignation as required on his 75th birthday just a week earlier, and was long identified as an opponent of Bergoglio within the Argentine Episcopal Conference. Fernández said his program for the archdiocese would be "Evangelium gaudium, but seriously, not as a slogan", and that Francis has told him to look carefully at the archdiocesan seminary. He was enthroned in his archdiocese on the following 16 June.

Relationship with Pope Francis
Hs relationship with Pope Francis dates to his work for the Argentine Bishops' Conference where he demonstrated his ability to incorporate different viewpoints in drafting group statements. As head of the drafting committee for the Aparecida Conference of CELAM in 2007, Francis relied on Fernandez' skill. The résistance on the part of Roman Curia to Francis' selection of Fernández as rector of UCA is thought to have solidified Francis' support and prompted his naming Fernández an archbishop and giving him important assignments as well.

Trusted by Pope Francis, he is commonly recognized as a contributor to the exhortation Evangelii gaudium. He has also been credited with writing the encyclical Laudato Si'.

Called Francis' "trusted theologian", he is said to have been the principal author of Amoris Laetitia, the apostolic exhortation issued by Francis in 2016 following the two sessions of the Synod of Bishops on the Family. In his own extended defense of Amoris, Fernandez argued for greater latitude when deciding giving Communion to the divorced and remarried. He wrote that "one cannot maintain those [sexual] acts in each and every case are gravely dishonest in a subjective sense. In the complexity of particular situations is where, according to St. Thomas [Aquinas], 'the indetermination increases'." He has also said that "in many issues I am far more progressive than the Pope".

Francis cited his essay "The good things of living in this time" in a talk to the clergy of Rome in February 2018.

Works
He already published more than 300 books and articles in Argentina and in countries in Latin America and Europe, which have been translated into several languages, including English, Portuguese, French, Italian and Polish. His writings of spirituality combine scholarship with practicality, contributions of psychology, biblical exegesis and dialogue with several religions.

In Il progetto di Francesco. Dove vuole portare la Chiesa (The Francis project. Where he wants to take the Church), a book-length interview Fernandez gave to the journalist Paolo Rodari from the Italian daily La Repubblica, he describes the broad themes of Francis' papacy, the need to view moral issues in context rather than assert them as non-negotiable, to "set hearts on fire" rather than reiterate dated "philosophical or natural law-related" arguments. He said: "For example, it is no good opposing same-sex marriage because people tend to see us as a group of resentful, cruel, insensitive, over-the-top even, individuals. It is an entirely different thing to talk about the beauty of marriage and the harmony of differences that form part of an alliance between a man and woman. This positive context speaks for itself when it comes to showing that the use of the same term 'marriage' to describe same-sex unions, in unsuitable."

This is a list of his principal writings.

Theology
Salir de sí. Plenitud de conocimiento y de vida, 1991.
Dios y el hombre en los límites, 1993.
Sáname con tu Boca: El Arte de Besar, 1995.
Actividad, espiritualidad y descanso''', 2001.Vivir en paz, 2003.Catequesis con Espíritu, 2003.La gracia y la vida entera, 2003.Claves para vivir en plenitud, 2003.Teología espiritual encarnada. Profundidad espiritual en acción, 2004La oración pastoral, 2006Gracia. Nociones básicas para pensar la vida nueva, 2010.Contemplativi nell´azione attivi nella contemplazione, 2014.
Biblical theology and exegesisSan Juan y su mundo. Comentario al cuarto Evangelio, 1992.El Apocalipsis y el tercer milenio, 1998.El Evangelio de Juan. Un comentario pastoral, 1999.El Evangelio de cada día. Comentario, 2000.El Evangelio de cada día. Santoral, 2003.Para mejorar tu relación con María, 2004.Cómo interpretar y comunicar la Palabra de Dios. Métodos y recursos prácticos, 2008.Pablo apasionado. De Tarso hasta su plenitud, 2008.El Evangelio del Domingo 1. Comentario para meditar, 2012.El Evangelio del Domingo 2. Comentario para meditar, 2012.El Evangelio del Domingo 3. Comentario para meditar'', 2013.

References

1962 births
Living people
People from Córdoba Province, Argentina
Pontifical Gregorian University alumni
Pontifical Catholic University of Argentina alumni
Academic staff of the Pontifical Catholic University of Argentina
21st-century Roman Catholic archbishops in Argentina
Argentine Roman Catholic theologians
Roman Catholic archbishops of La Plata in Argentina
Bishops appointed by Pope Francis